David Neal (born 4 September 1951) is a New Zealand cricketer. He played in 27 first-class and 6 List A matches for Central Districts from 1971 to 1977.

See also
 List of Central Districts representative cricketers

References

External links
 

1951 births
Living people
New Zealand cricketers
Central Districts cricketers
Cricketers from Blenheim, New Zealand